The Badozai are a Pashtun tribe, found generally in Pakistan.

British descriptions
In the 1885 The cyclopædia of India and of eastern and southern Asia, the author cited one "MacGregor", describing the Badozai:
...a tribe inhabiting the Past-i-Koh, to the west of Sib, in the Kohistan of Baluchistan, Muzaffargarh and multan.

Badozai belong to Pashtun tribe originally migrated from Kandahar Afghanistan centuries ago, majority can be found in Multan, Pakistan. Historically the Badozai Tribe have passionately fought for a long time alongside British against the ex-ruler of Punjab Maharaja Ranjit Singh. 

The main sectors the Badozai tribe belong to are agriculture mainly owning Mango orchard farms in Multan. 

The land which is associated with mango orchards is located in Lutfabad in Multan. Having produced one of the very pristine Mangoes, they also export the mangoes to the foreign lands such as United Kingdom.

References

Durrani Pashtun tribes